Todd Woodbridge and Mark Woodforde were the defending champions.

Woodbridge and Woodforde successfully defended their title, defeating Gary Muller and Danie Visser 6–1, 3–6, 6–2 in the final.

Seeds
All seeds receive a bye into the second round.

Draw

Finals

Top half

Bottom half

External links
1993 Stockholm Open Draw

Doubles